Tupaiid betaherpesvirus 1 (TuHV-1) is a species of virus in the genus Quwivirus in the subfamily Betaherpesvirinae, family Herpesviridae, and order Herpesvirales.

References

Betaherpesvirinae